Soul Harvest: The World Takes Sides is the fourth book in the Left Behind series. It was written by Tim LaHaye and Jerry B. Jenkins in 1999. It takes place 21–27 months into the Tribulation.

Plot summary
After the Wrath of the Lamb earthquake, Rayford Steele must find his wife Amanda White, who was supposed to land in New Babylon. Buck Williams must find his wife Chloe Steele, who was last seen in a house that is now a shattered ruin. The only other person accounted for is Tsion Ben-Judah, and nearly a quarter of the world's population was snuffed out by the earthquake. The Global Community (GC) starts a new program called Cellular Solar, aka: Cell-Sol (pronounced sell-soul), a solar powered cell phone global network. Both Buck and Tsion find a new home for the Tribulation Force, half of a duplex belonging to the late Donny Moore and his wife, after discovering the death of Loretta, a close friend to the Tribulation Force, and after Buck rescues Tsion from the shelter under the church where he lived.

Nicolae Carpathia is revealed to have believed Revelation about the earthquake, because all surviving GC in New Babylon move into a massive underground shelter. Mac McCullum, Rayford's co-pilot, wants to know what Rayford knows about Carpathia, not believing that someone who thought only of his own life (as Nicolae did during the earthquake) could be divine. Leon Fortunato, a sycophant of Carpathia and now his Supreme Commander, claims that Carpathia resurrected him from the wreckage of GC headquarters in New Babylon.

Buck searches for Chloe, discovering she is pregnant with their baby. He also meets Floyd Charles, a physician and fellow believer, who later joins the Trib. Force. Mac, becomes a Believer. Believers around the world discover that they have received a sign on their foreheads visible only to other believers, leading to the common phrase, “I can see yours. Can you see mine?” This mark becomes a central plot device, since believers are able to locate each other with ease and yet blend in with Antichrist and Global Community Potentate Nicolae Carpathia's henchmen when necessary.

Buck finds Chloe in a GC Hospital and rescues her, taking her back to the house where he and Tsion are staying. Tsion is planning to go back to Israel to teach the 144,000 witnesses. Ken Ritz becomes a believer as well. After TV signals return, they discover that the content is terrible from nudity, sexuality, torture, black arts, and more.

The Trib. Force finds Hattie Durham in an abortion clinic in Denver and discovers that Carpathia is plotting to have both Rayford and Hattie murdered there. Pretending to be Rayford, Buck rescues Hattie and unwittingly punches and kills an armed security guard intent on killing them. Later, Buck deeply regrets the guard's death even after one of his friends explains it was a "kill or be killed" situation.

Rayford, who continues to fly the Condor 216 for Carpathia, tries to find Amanda's body. He buys two sets of scuba gear to dive to the bottom of the Tigris River with Mac. Hattie is sick and Trib. Force members try to get her to accept God. Rayford and Mac find his wife's body as the First of the Seven Trumpet Judgments, flaming hailstones and blood pour down from the sky. Rayford is suicidal upon finding Amanda and tries to drown himself, but Mac will not allow it. Rayford recovers her laptop and says that the Hard Drive is intact. Rayford and Mac discuss that they did not see the mark of the Believer on Amanda, but decide that this is inconclusive because they do not know if she died before or after the marks started appearing, or if the mark stays on the believer or goes away after they die.

The GCASA (Global Community Aeronautics and Space Administration), find that a new comet is going to crash into the ocean, killing marine life and sinking ships. This is the second Trumpet Judgment. Ten weeks later, right before the Trib. Force travels to Israel for the Meeting of the Witnesses, the GCASA find a new threat in the heavens, a star called Wormwood. The GC tries to destroy it, but before they are able to effect a nuclear strike on it, it shatters into billions of pieces that fall into the lakes, streams, and fountains, turning the water to a bitter poison. This is the Third Trumpet Judgment.

Characters
Rayford Steele
Buck Williams
Chloe Steele Williams
Amanda White, confirmed dead in this book
Mac McCullum
Tsion Ben-Judah
Dr. Chaim Rosenzweig
David Hassid
Hattie Durham
Ken Ritz
Al B.
Global Community Supreme Potentate Nicolae Carpathia
Pontifex Maximus Peter Mathews, aka Peter II, head of Enigma Babylon One World Faith.
Supreme Commander Leon Fortunato, confirmed dead and resurrected in this book
Donny Moore, confirmed dead in this book
Sandy Moore, confirmed dead in this book
Dr. Floyd Charles

References

Left Behind series
1999 American novels
American post-apocalyptic novels
Novels set in Denver
Novels set in Iraq
Novels set in the United States

pl:Syn zatracenia